Wiggly, Wiggly Christmas, released in 1996 by ABC Music distributed by EMI. It is the Wiggles' seventh album and the group's first Christmas album. It was made into a video the following year.

Track listing

Personnel
Credits are taken from the album's liner notes.

The Wiggles are: Murray Cook, Jeff Fatt, Greg Page, and Anthony Field

 Vocals - Greg Page
 Backing Vocals - Paul Paddick, The Wiggles
 Trumpet, Piccolo Trumpet and Flugelhorn - Dom Lindsay
 Cello - Margaret Lindsay
 Viola - Angela Lindsay
 Violin - Maria Schattovits
 Drums - Tony Henry, Peter Iacono
 Guitars - Terry Murray, Rex Kellehr, Murray Cook, Anthony Field and Greg Page
 Bass - Murray Cook
 Organs, Piano, Accordion - Jeff Fatt

Staff
 Engineered by: Chris Brooks, Alex Keller, Roy Mollace, Aaron Ruig
 Recorded at The Tracking Station Studios, Sydney

2017 album

Wiggly, Wiggly Christmas! is a Wiggles album released on 27 October 2017.

Track list

Personnel
The Wiggles: Anthony Field, Lachlan Gillespie, Simon Pryce, Emma Watkins
Music Produced by Anthony Field & Lachlan Gillespie
Vocals: Lachlan Gillespie, Greg Page, Paul Paddick, Simon Pryce, Emma Watkins
Backing Vocals: Lachlan Gillespie, Paul Paddick, Simon Pryce, Emma Watkins
Santa: Paul Paddick
Bass Guitar: Alex Keller
Piano: Lachlan Gillespie
Keyboard: Oliver Brian, Lachlan Gillespie
Trumpet: Michael McFadden
Drum Programming: Oliver Brian
Sleigh Bells: Oliver Brian
Acoustic & Electric Guitar: Oliver Brian, Anthony Field, Alex Keller
Nylon Guitar: Oliver Brian
Claps: Lachlan Gillespie, Simon Pryce, Emma Watkins
Bass Drum: Anthony Field
Marching Snare: Oliver Brian
Character Voices: Maria Field, Lachlan Gillespie, Paul Paddick
Bagpipes: Anthony Field
Wags the Dog: Lachlan Gillespie
Dialogue: Anthony Field
Banjo: Anthony Field
Dobro: Oliver Brian

Staff
Music Recorded at Hot Potato Studios, Sydney, NSW
Music Recorded & Mixed by Alex Keller
Production Manager: Kate Chiodo
Graphic Design: Daniel Attard
Still Photographer: Daniel Attard

Video

The album was also made into a video with the same title. It was originally released in 1997 in the Australia region. It was later edited and re-released in 1999 to account for changes made in the TV series and the addition of a "Wiggly Christmas Medley".

Song list
 Have a Very Merry Christmas
 Wiggly, Wiggly Christmas
 Rudolf the Red-Nose Reindeer
 Here Comes Santa Claus
 Go Santa Go
 Ding Dong Merrily on High
 Christmas Star
 Unto Us, This Holy Night
 Feliz Navidad
 Jingle Bells
 Christmas Picnic
 Let's Clap Hands for Santa Claus
 Henry's Christmas Dance
 Jeff's Christmas Tune
 It's a Christmas Party on the Goodship Feathersword
 Away in a Manger
 Wags is Bouncing Around the Christmas Tree
 Silent Night
 We Wish You a Merry Christmas

Production
As with The Wiggles Movie, the costumes for The Wiggles and friends were updated. It is the first video besides the movie where The Wiggles have logos on their shirts. Producer and Director Dean Covell added "3D animation" to the videos.

The Christmas set was in the background during the taping of the interviews with The Wiggles and Captain Feathersword for The Wiggles Movie Soundtrack Enhance CD bonus track.

Release
In an August 1997 article by The Sun-Herald, the Wiggles planned to release the Christmas video in November, and was going to tour New South Wales and Victoria.  The Powerhouse Museum website listed the video as being released in September 1997. However, the Wiggles Exhibition itself at Powerhouse featured a promotion poster with a video release date of 13 October 1997.

Cast
The Wiggles are:
 Murray Cook
 Jeff Fatt
 Anthony Field
 Greg Page

Additional cast include:
 Paul Paddick as Captain Feathersword
 Leeanne Ashley as Dorothy the Dinosaur
 Carolyn Ferrie provides Dorothy's voice
 Charmaine Martin as Henry the Octopus
 Edward Rooke as Wags the Dog
 Jonathon Mill as Santa Claus

1999 re-release

The video was re-released in 1999 with the removal of "Rudolf the Red-Nosed Reindeer", and the addition of a concert track called "Wiggly Christmas Medley".

In 2018, the 1999 video version was released into multiple segments on their YouTube channel as Classic Wiggles.

Home release
A listing of release dates for the 1999 edition.  The US DVD features a photo gallery.

VHS
 Region 4 (Australia): 1999 (Roadshow/ABC Video #102341)
 Region 2 (United Kingdom): 1 November 1999 (Buena Vista/Walt Disney Home Video, EAN 5017186111975)
 Region 1 (North America): 24 October 2000 (HIT Entertainment, under Lyrick Studios #2505)

DVD
 Region 1 (North America): 30 September 2003 (HIT Entertainment #24031)
 Region 2 (United Kingdom): 21 November 2005 (HIT Entertainment HIT41802 2-pack with Yule Be Wiggling)
 Region 4 (Australia): 9 October 2006 (Roadshow #102341-9)

2017 video

Wiggly, Wiggly Christmas is a Wiggles video that was released on 1 November 2017, a partial remake named after the 1997 video of the same name.

Song list
Wiggly, Wiggly Christmas
Here Come the Reindeer
Jingle Bells
It's a Christmas Party on the Goodship Feathersword
A Christmas Story
Go Santa Go (featuring Greg Wiggle)
Henry's Christmas Merengue
Christmas Picnic
Dorothy's Special Christmas Cake
Curoo Curoo (The Carol of the Birds)
Christmas Serenade
Shining Around the World
Wags is Bouncing Around the Christmas Tree
Away in a Manger
Great Big Man in Red
Let's Clap Hands for Santa Claus
Stille Nacht
Christmas Carol Mega Mix

Notes

References

External links

The Wiggles albums
The Wiggles videos
1996 albums
1997 video albums
Australian Christmas films
2017 albums
2017 video albums
Australian children's musical films